Peter Shand Kydd (23 April 1925 – 23 March 2006) was the stepfather of Diana, Princess of Wales, and an heir to the wallpaper fortune built by his father Norman Shand Kydd (1895–1962). His mother was Frances Madalein Foy (died 1983). He was half-brother to champion amateur jockey William Shand Kydd (1937–2014), who was the husband of Christina Muriel Duncan, sister of Veronica Bingham, Countess of Lucan.

Marriages
He married Janet Munro Kerr, granddaughter of John Martin Munro Kerr. He sold the family business in 1962 and moved his family to Australia, where he became a sheep farmer.

After selling the farm and returning to England, and still married, he began an affair with Diana's mother (Frances) Viscountess Althorp. She was married to John Spencer, Viscount Althorp, later 8th Earl Spencer. They both divorced, and then were free to marry each other, which they did on 2 May 1969. He thus became stepfather to her four children, including Diana, although the Viscount eventually won the bitter custody battle. They lived in Buckinghamshire and West Itchenor, West Sussex, finally settling on a 1,000 acre (4 km²) farm on the remote Scottish island of Seil.  The couple separated in June 1988. Frances blamed the pressure of media attention, following the rise to fame of Diana, for the breakdown of the marriage.

In 1993, Shand Kydd married Marie-Pierre Palmer (née Bécret), a younger, chic, voluptuous, and French, woman who ran a champagne-importing business in London, which lasted until April 1995.

Descendants 
By his first wife, Shand Kydd had three children. Their elder son, Adam Shand Kydd, was born in 1954 and became a novelist (Happy Trails), before dying in Cambodia in 2004. John Shand Kydd, known as Johnnie, was born in 1959, and is a renowned photographer, with more than 70 works in the collection of the National Portrait Gallery.

Death 
Peter Shand Kydd died on 23 March 2006, at the age of eighty, and was buried on 6 April 2006 in Aldeburgh, Suffolk.

References

1925 births
2006 deaths
British emigrants to Australia
People from West Itchenor